ZTS: State of Entropy is a 2002 Australian drama film directed by Stefanos Stefanidis and starring Jai Koutrae and Glen Davenport.

Plot

Cast
Jai Koutrae ... Glen
Glen Davenport ... Mark
David Gambin ... Colin
Stacey Giaprakas ... Nick

External links

2002 drama films
2002 films
Australian drama films
2000s English-language films
2000s Australian films